The Hintertux Glacier is the tourist name for the glaciers of the Gefrorene-Wand-Kees, also called the Tuxer Ferner, and the nearby Riepenkees at the top of the Tuxertal, a side valley of the Zillertal in the Austrian state of Tyrol. Both glaciers are accessed by gondola and chair lifts and is one of only two ski resorts in the world offering skiing 365 days a year (the other being Zermatt in Switzerland). Hintertux glacier is one of the most popular glaciers in Austria. It is open all year round with skiing in the winter, and hiking activities in the summer.

Ice 

As a result, the lifts have to be moved several times a year so that the masts remain vertical. The glacier contains up to about 190 million cubic metres of ice.

Tourism 
The Hintertux Glacier offers skiing all year round. Its height means that there are usually good snow conditions, enabling almost all pistes and lifts to be kept open. The glacier skiing region has its own ski school for both beginners and advanced skiers.

In addition to the winter sports facilities the Hintertux Glacier offers an all-round view of the Alps from just under 3,250 m. The region is also suitable for mountaineering – there are plenty of Alpine huts, some managed all-year round. One of these huts is the Spannagelhaus next to the natural monument of the Spannagel Cave, which is over 10 km long and the largest cave system in the Austrian Central Alps. The cave entrance is immediately next to the Spannagelhaus.

A crevasse – the Natural Ice Palace (Natur Eis Palast) – can also be viewed. Its entrance is just above the top station on the Gletscherbus 3 lift. Visitors can climb about 25 metres down into the ice using a combination of steps and ladders.

Lift and cable cars 
To transport the large number of tourists on the Hintertux Glacier, three large gondola lifts of the Funitel type have been built: the so-called glacier buses (Gletscherbusse) where the gondolas are suspended on two steel cables and are able to carry 24 people each. The third large gondola lift was opened in the 2008/2009 winter season. It is now called the Gletscherbus 1 and runs from the valley station up to the Sommerbergalm. It replaced the older 4-man gondolas that had previously handled the transport of people to the Sommerbergalm along with the 8-man gondola lift that is still running. In order to ensure all-year operations there are 2 cableways in each section of the feeders from the valley station to the Gefrorene Wand. Overall, there are 18 lifts to transport winter sports tourist and other visitors from the Hintertux valley station (Talstation Hintertux, 1500 m) up to the glacier. Here are 360 degree panoramas of some of the cable cars "Gletcherbus" at 3033m and at 2660 m.

Gallery

External links 
 Homepage of the Hintertux Glacier

References 

Glaciers of Austria
Glaciers of the Alps
GHintertux Glacier
Ski areas in Austria
Schwaz District
Zillertal Alps
Landforms of Tyrol (state)
Tourist attractions in Tyrol (state)